The 2021–22 CEV Cup was the 50th edition of the second most important European volleyball club competition organised by the European Volleyball Confederation.

Participating teams
Drawing of Lots took place on 25 June 2021 in Luxembourg City.

Format
Qualification round (Home and away matches):
32nd Finals

Main phase (Home and away matches):
16th Finals → 8th Finals → 4th Finals

Final phase (Home and away matches):
Semifinals → Finals

Aggregate score is counted as follows: 3 points for 3–0 or 3–1 win, 2 points for 3–2 win, 1 point for 2–3 loss.
In case the teams are tied after two legs, a Golden Set is played immediately at the completion of the second leg.

Qualification round

32nd Finals
|}

First leg

|}

Second leg

|}

Main phase

16th Finals
|}

First leg 

|}

Second leg

|}

8th Finals

|}

First leg

|}

Second leg

|}

4th Finals

|}

First leg

|}

Second leg

|}

Final phase

Semifinals
|}

First leg

|}

Second leg

|}

Finals

|}

First leg

|}

Second leg

|}

Final standings

Notes

References

External links
 Official website

CEV Cup
CEV Cup
CEV Cup